Perry State Park is a state park located in Jefferson County, near Ozawkie, Kansas, United States,  northeast of Topeka.

The state park features camping, a beach, hiking and a fishing and boating area. Perry State Park was established in 1968 after an agreement was made between the Kansas Parks and Resources and the U.S. Army Corps of Engineers.

See also
 Perry Lake
 List of Kansas state parks
 List of lakes, reservoirs, and dams in Kansas
 List of rivers of Kansas

References

State parks of Kansas
Protected areas of Jefferson County, Kansas
Protected areas established in 1968
1968 establishments in Kansas